Pamela Barnett (born March 2, 1944) is an American professional golfer who played on the LPGA Tour.

Barnett won once on the LPGA Tour in 1971.

Professional wins (1)

LPGA Tour wins (1)

References

External links

American female golfers
LPGA Tour golfers
Golfers from Charlotte, North Carolina
Winthrop University alumni
1944 births
Living people
21st-century American women